The Wild Duck Cluster (also known as Messier 11, or NGC 6705) is an open cluster of stars in the constellation Scutum (the Shield). It was discovered by Gottfried Kirch in 1681. Charles Messier included it in his catalogue of diffuse objects in 1764. Its popular name derives from the brighter stars forming a triangle which could resemble a flying flock of ducks (or, from other angles, one swimming duck). The cluster is located just to the east of the Scutum Star Cloud midpoint.

The Wild Duck Cluster is one of the richest and most compact of the known open clusters. It is one of the most massive open clusters known, and it has been extensively studied. Its age has been estimated to about 316 million years. The brightest cluster member is visual magnitude 8, and it has 870 members of at least magnitude 16.5. It has an integrated absolute magnitude of –6.5, and a visual extinction of 1.3.

The cluster is metal-rich with an iron abundance of [Fe/H] = . Despite its youth, it shows an enhancement of Alpha process elements. Possibly this is due to an enhancement of its birth molecular cloud by a nearby Type II supernova explosion. At least nine variable star members have been identified with high probability, plus 29 lower probability members. The former include two eclipsing binary star systems.

Gallery

See also
 List of Messier objects

References

External links

 Messier 11, SEDS Messier pages
 Messier 11, Wild Duck Cluster
 Messier 11 - LRGB result based on 2 hrs total data
 

Open clusters
Carina–Sagittarius Arm
Wild Duck Cluster
NGC objects
Scutum (constellation)
?